Verdens Lykkeligste Mand is the tenth studio album by the Danish pop group TV·2. It was released in 1994 on Pladecompagniet.

Track list 
All lyrics and music were written by Steffen Brandt.

Personnel

Production 
Henrik Nilsson – producer and engineer
Michael Bruun – producer
Greg Walsh – producer
Kasper Winding – producer
tv·2 – producer
Allan Ryg Krohn – ass. engineer
Michael Munk – ass. engineer
Anders Frandsen – studio check
Michael Bruun – executive producer
Bo Andersen – supervision
Jan Degner – supervision
Poul Martin Bonde – supervision

Musicians 
Hans Erik Lerchenfeld – guitar
Georg Olesen – bass
Sven Gaul – drummer
Steffen Brandt – lyricist, composer, singer, keyboards and sitar
Niels Hoppe – saxophone and arrangement
Knud Erik Nørgaard – trumpet
Christian Høgh – trombone
Henrik Nilsson – hammond organ, wurlitzer and keyboards
Lei Moe – chorus
Jeanett Krüger – chorus
Flemming Osterman – chorus
Ivan Pedersen – chorus

References

External links 
Verdens lykkeligste mand on tv·2s website

1994 albums
TV-2 (band) albums